Massow is a municipality in Germany. 

Massow may also refer to:
Maszewo, a town in Poland known in German as Massow
Ivan Massow (born 1967), British entrepreneur and media personality
Julie von Massow (1825–1901), Prussian religious activist